Gideon Lucas Gwani (born 20th-century) is a Nigerian politician currently serving as House Minority Whip.

He is a PDP member of the house of representatives from Kaduna State.

See also 

 List of members of the House of Representatives of Nigeria, 2019–2023

References 

20th-century births
Living people
Year of birth missing (living people)
21st-century Nigerian politicians
Peoples Democratic Party members of the House of Representatives (Nigeria)
Nigerian Christians
Politicians from Kaduna State